Gordon Melluish (25 August 1906 – 14 April 1977) was an English cricketer. He played four matches for Essex in 1926.

References

External links

1906 births
1977 deaths
English cricketers
Essex cricketers
People from Marylebone
Cricketers from Greater London